is a 2004 production, and the 17th installment in the Ultra Series that was broadcast in Japan in 2004. It is a remake of Ultra Q, the first installment of the Ultra Series. It retains the same swirling effect for the title card, but with the words "Dark Fantasy" added underneath, the title also remains black and white. The final episode confirmed this is not a sequel; rather, it is another timeline in which the original series is portrayed as a television show.

Characters

Goichi Sakamoto (Yoshihiko Hakamada): A journalist for Global Magazine'''s subdivision, MIND Magazine. It covers everything, including the paranormal. Though he is considered eccentric, he is an expert journalist and is good with computers. Ever since he first joined, the magazine's sales have increased at an astronomical level. He was formerly a student of Watarai, and still retains contact.
Ryo Kusunoki (Kumiko Endo): A 25-year-old freelance photographer who also works for MIND''. Though she appears to hate Goichi, she actually respects him a great deal. 
Kakunoshin Watarai (Masao Kusakari): A 54-year-old inventor, and a professor of science at Teito University. He spent some years in Britain, where he found his craving for biscuits and tea. He is knowledgeable in many topics, especially science, history, mythology, and folklore.

External links
Official Ultra Q: Dark Fantasy Episode Guide

2004 Japanese television series debuts
2004 Japanese television series endings
Dark fantasy television series
Japanese science fiction television series
Ultra Q
Japanese anthology television series
Ultra television series
TV Tokyo original programming